Birgel is an Ortsgemeinde – a municipality belonging to a Verbandsgemeinde, a kind of collective municipality – in the Vulkaneifel district in Rhineland-Palatinate, Germany. It belongs to the Verbandsgemeinde of Gerolstein, whose seat is in the municipality of Gerolstein.

Geography

Location 
The municipality lies in the Eifel on the upper Kyll, halfway between Trier and Cologne. It is linked to the outside world by Bundesstraße 421 and the Cologne-Trier railway (Lissendorf station).

Geology 
The municipality belongs to the Kalkeifel (“Limestone Eifel”) and lies on the southern edge of the Dollendorf Limestone Basin (Dollendorfer Kalkmulde). The elevation ranges from about 400 m above sea level on the Kyll at Crumpsmühle to about 526 m above sea level at the Hirzberg (mountain).

Geologically, three formations characterize the municipality. The outliers of the Middle Devonian limestone basin in the north, the bunter in the middle and the east and the sediments of the Kyll in the west.

Arising from this are the great amounts of groundwater found here, which supply not only Birgel but also other municipalities in the Verbandsgemeinde of Obere Kyll with drinking water.

Geological and natural peculiarities 
 Bunter crags in the Birgeler Hardt, protected as a natural monument since 1948
 Kalkofen, literally “Limekiln”, a former limestone quarry on the Hirschberg
 Butterley, dolomite crags on the Hirschberg, protected as a natural monument since 1938
 Kyll valley floodplain
 Wiesbach with Wiesbachmoor (moor) and Arnikawiese (meadow)
 Burgberg with high Celtic settlement and former sand quarries

History 
In 1222, Birgel had its first documentary mention in the commentary of Prüm Abbey’s directory of holdings, the Prümer Urbar. In 1457, Gerhard von Loen, Count of Blankenheim, acquired half an estate in Birgel. As well, the Lords of Mirbach had ownership rights in the village, as they styled themselves “Lords of Birgel” in one document from the 16th century. In that same century, Birgel ended up in the power of the County of Gerolstein. The Elector of Trier owned his own fief in the village. The Electoral-Trier Amtmann (Amt official) at Daun received annuities from Birgel. Foremost among the rulers, however, remained the Counts of Blankenheim-Manderscheid-Gerolstein. On the occasion of an agreement in 1547, it was decided that Birgel belonged in Gerolstein's hands. In the 19th century, Birgel became the seat of the Lissendorf-Birgel Amt administration. The administration bore the title “Amt Lissendorf in Birgel”. In the course of administrative restructuring, the formerly self-administering Ämter of Stadtkyll and Lissendorf-Birgel were dissolved, and Birgel was grouped into the newly formed Verbandsgemeinde of Obere Kyll with its seat at Jünkerath.

In 2006, the municipality of Birgel received first place in the contest Unser Dorf hat Zukunft (“Our Village Has a Future”) in the Vulkaneifel (then still Daun) district's main class.

Population development 
In 1960, Birgel had roughly 520 inhabitants. The population peaked in 1990 at about 590 inhabitants. Currently, roughly 540 people have a primary or secondary residence in Birgel.

Politics

Municipal council 
The council is made up of 8 council members, who were elected by majority vote at the municipal election held on 7 June 2009, and the honorary mayor as chairman.

Coat of arms 
The German blazon reads: In grün über silbernem Dreiberg ein silberner Hirschkopf im Visier mit silbernem Hochkreuz zwischen den Geweihstangen.

The municipality's arms might in English heraldic language be described thus: Vert in base a mount of three upon which a stag's head caboshed, between his attires a Latin cross, all argent.

The “mount of three” – a charge called a Dreiberg in German heraldry – is canting for the municipality's name, as “Birgel” (formerly called Birglin or Birgle) is a diminutive of the German word Berg, meaning “mountain”. The stag's head and the cross between his antlers (“attires”) form one of Saint Hubert's attributes, thus making it a reference to the local chapel's patron.

Culture and sightseeing 

Buildings:
 Kapelle St. Hubertus (Saint Hubert's Chapel), an aisleless church from the early 16th century
 Butterley (crags)
 Hubertuseiche (Saint Hubert's Oak)
 Historical watermill with mill museum
 Bahnhofstraße 12 – a Quereinhaus (a combination residential and commercial house divided for these two purposes down the middle, perpendicularly to the street) from 1882
 Dorfstraße 1 – corner house from 1808, more recent commercial building, old cobblestones in the yard

Economy and infrastructure

Public institutions 
 Community centre
 Fire station
 Chapel consecrated to Saint Hubert
 Graveyard with consecration hall
 Sporting ground with barbecue pavilion and multipurpose hall
 Nature playground with football pitch (dedicated in 2006)

References

External links 
 Municipality’s official webpage 
 Birgel historical watermill 

Vulkaneifel